Harper Avenue may refer to:

Places
Harper Avenue (Chicago), Illinois, US
Harper Avenue (Detroit), Michigan, US; see Harper Woods, Michigan
Harper Avenue (Los Angeles), West Hollywood, California, US
North Harper Avenue Historic District, West Hollywood; see National Register of Historic Places listings in Los Angeles County, California
Harper Avenue, Christchurch, New Zealand

Other
Harper Avenue, an imprint of HarperCollins Canada